Perrottetia is a genus of flowering plants in the family Dipentodontaceae described as a family in 1824. Species occur in China, Southeast Asia, Papuasia, Hawaii, Australia, and Latin America. It is the largest genus of the recently described order Huerteales.

Taxonomy
This genus was previously placed in the staff vine family, Celastraceae., but molecular evidence has shown that it not related and better placed with ''Dipentodon'' in a separate family Dipentodontaceae.

Species and subspecies
accepted taxa
 Perrottetia alpestris   - insular Southeast Asia, Papuasia, Queensland
 subsp. moluccana  
 subsp. philippinensis  
 Perrottetia arisanensis   - Yunnan, Taiwan
 Perrottetia caliensis  - Colombia
 Perrottetia calva  - Colombia
 Perrottetia colorata  - Colombia
 Perrottetia distichophylla  - Colombia
 Perrottetia excelsa   - Panama
 Perrottetia gentryi   - Colombia, Peru, Bolivia
 Perrottetia guacharana  - Colombia
 Perrottetia lanceolata  - Venezuela
 Perrottetia longistylis  - S Mexico, Central America
 Perrottetia maxima  - Colombia
 Perrottetia multiflora  - from Costa Rica to Peru
 Perrottetia ovata  - C + S Mexico
 Perrottetia quinduensis  - Venezuela, Colombia, Ecuador, Bolivia
 Perrottetia racemosa  - S China
 Perrottetia sandwicensis  – Olomea or Waimea - Hawaii
 Perrottetia sessiliflora  - Chiapas, Costa Rica, Panama, Colombia, Ecuador, Peru
 Perrottetia simplicissima  - Colombia

References

External links